Stoney Creek Airport  is located  east of Stoney Creek, Ontario, Canada.

The airport was home to Experimental Aircraft Association chapter 65.

References

Registered aerodromes in Ontario
Transport buildings and structures in Hamilton, Ontario